The 2012 AFC U-19 Championship was an international under-19 age group football tournament held in United Arab Emirates from 3 – 17 November 2012. The sixteen national teams involved in the tournament were required to register a squad of maximum 23 players; only players in these squads were eligible to take part in the tournament.

The age listed for each player is on 3 November 2012, the first day of the tournament. The nationality for each club reflects the national association (not the league) to which the club is affiliated. A flag is included for coaches that are of a different nationality than their own national team. Players in boldface have been capped at full international level at some point in their career.

Group A

United Arab Emirates

Head coach: Eid Baroot

Japan

Head coach: Yasushi Yoshida

The final squad was announced on 18 October 2012.

Iran

Head coach: Akbar Mohammadi

Kuwait

Head coach: Mubarak Al-Meseb

Group B

South Korea

Head coach: Lee Kwang-Jong

The final squad was announced on 24 October 2012.

China PR

Head coach:  Jan Olde Riekerink

The final squad was announced on 18 October 2012.

Thailand

Head coach: Arjhan Srong-ngamsub

The final squad was announced on 19 October 2012.

Iraq

Head coach: Hakeem Shaker

Group C

North Korea

Head coach: An Ye-gun

Uzbekistan

Head coach: Ahmadjon Musaev

The final squad was announced on 29 October 2012.

Vietnam
Head coach: Mai Đức Chung

The final squad was announced on 25 October 2012.

Jordan
Head Coach: Jamal Abu Abed

The final squad was announced on 29 October 2012.

Group D

Australia
Head coach: Paul Okon

The final squad was announced on 23 October 2012.

Saudi Arabia
Head coach:  Sergio Piernas

The final squad was announced on 30 October 2012.

Syria

Qatar

References

External links
  

Squads